"Candy" (Korean: 캔디) is a song recorded by South Korean boy group H.O.T.; it was released as part of the group's debut studio album We Hate All Kinds of Violence on September 7, 1996 via SM Entertainment. Along with "Warrior's Descendant", it serves as one of the two singles from the record. Upon the album's release, "Candy" was met with widespread recognition in South Korea and has been credited with sparking a new wave of mainstream music in the country's youth. 

H.O.T. promoted "Candy" with televised live performances on weekly South Korean music programs in late 1996 and January 1997, and topped the chart rankings for several weeks. At the 11th Golden Disc Awards, the group received the Best New Artist award for "Candy". In a 2005 survey conducted by MTV Korea, it was voted the most popular song of 1996 in South Korea by netizens.

Background 

H.O.T. made its debut on September 7, 1996, with the release of the album We Hate All Kinds of Violence. It experienced instant commercial success in South Korea and has since reportedly sold over 1.5 million copies. The trainee system laid by SM with H.O.T. has led them to be considered the first idol group in K-pop.

Release
"Candy" serves as the second single from the album following "Warrior's Descent". It is a cheerful bubblegum pop song that established the group's popularity in South Korea. The fashion, rap skills and dance moves shown through "Candy" has been noted by popular cultural commentators for sparking a new wave of mainstream music in South Korea.

Live performances
Following promotions for the first single "Descent of Warriors", H.O.T. began promoting the album's second single, "Candy", on televised weekly music programs in November 1996. The stages for "Candy" exemplifies the level of coordination regarding idol costumes, with each member wearing a designated color and accessorized with face paint, fuzzy oversized mittens, visors, bucket hats, and earmuffs, and used stuffed animals, backpacks, and messenger bags as props. On October 13 and 14, 2018, H.O.T. performed "Candy" at their reunion concert "Forever [Highfive Of Teenagers]" at the Seoul Olympic Stadium, which attracted a total of 100,000 attendees.

Accolades
"Candy" won the Best New Artist award at the 11th Golden Disc Awards. It achieved the top position on SBS's TV Gayo 20 (former version of Inkigayo), MBC's Popular Songs Best 50 (former version of Show! Music Core), and KBS's Top 10 Songs (former version of Music Bank).

Impact and legacy
The release of "Candy" presented a softer and gentler form of pop music with upbeat and cheerful melodies accompanied by energetic dance moves—a formula adopted by many subsequent Korean idol groups. Ranking it as the best K-pop song of all time in 2012, David Bevan of Spin magazine wrote "Seo Taiji may have laid K-pop’s foundation a few years earlier, but it was H.O.T., a boy band engineered in part by SM kingpin Lee Soo-Man, that ushered in the 'idol' cult that's propelled Korean pop cultural product as far and wide as it's come in the past ten years." In 2014, Mnet included "Candy" in their countdown list of Legend 100 Songs, a list of 100 influential songs in Korean popular music history since the 1960s. 

That same year, music webzine Music Taste Y ranked it at number 25 in their list of 120 greatest dance songs of all time, where critic Kim Yun-ha noted the multi use marketing that commercializes not only music, but also fashion and characters, and said that the song acts as sort of the ancestor of all those combined elements that the K-pop industry has become accustomed to in the present. 35 music and pop culture critics organized by Seoul Shinmun and Melon ranked "Candy" at number 17 in a 2021 list of the 100 best K-pop songs of all time; critic Jeong Byeong-wook echoed that its beats, "dances, related fashions, various derivatives, and the fandom culture that surrounds it have all become pioneering models of the K-pop business today."

NCT Dream version 

South Korean boy group NCT Dream released another version of "Candy" on December 16, 2022. It served as the lead single for their extended play of the same name. The song was featured on a commercial. It debuted at number seven on the Circle Digital Chart.

Release and promotion 
On November 18, 2022, NCT Dream announced that they would re-record "Candy" and release it as the lead single for their Christmas-themed extended play of the same name. Before its release, the song was featured in a Kookmin Bank's commercial starring the group. A portion of the song was featured in promotional videos released via YouTube Shorts. A teaser for the music video was released on December 14. The song was released on December 16, 2022, alongside an accompanying music video, showing the members seize a candy factory and celebrating Christmas. NCT Dream performed the song at the 2022 KBS Song Festival on the same day of release. They performed the song alongside the b-side "Graduation" on South Korean music show Show! Music Core on December 17.

Chart performance 
"Candy" debuted at number seven on the Circle Digital Chart in the issue dated December 11–17, 2022, and peaked at number three the next week. The song debuted at number one on the component Download Chart. It debuted at number 14 and 122 on the component BGM Chart and on the component Streaming Chart respectively. The song peaked at number 63 on the Billboard Japan Hot 100 in the chart issue dated December 28, 2022. It peaked at number 198 on the Billboard Global 200 in the chart issue dated December 31, 2022.

Accolades

Charts

Weekly charts

Monthly charts

References

1996 singles
1996 songs
SM Entertainment singles
Korean-language songs
K-pop songs
Bubblegum pop songs
Dance-pop songs